Big Brother México is a reality television series based on the international Big Brother format produced in the Netherlands by Endemol.  Big Brother México was launched by Televisa in 2002. Before its debut, the idea of being watched twenty-four hours a day by a camera was shocking to some in Mexican society. The series was successful, and it was followed by a special edition called Big Brother VIP with Mexican celebrities from show business and even politics.

Congressman Jorge Kahwagi, minority whip of the Mexican Green Party in the Chamber of Deputies of Mexico's Congress, shocked and angered many people in Mexico when he asked to be excused from his post in Congress to be sequestered for months inside the Big Brother House. Critics among colleagues and the general public accused him of dereliction of duty, discrediting his office, and seeking personal gain. During the show, late-night variety-show host, comedian, and producer Adal Ramones, also from Televisa, made a send-up of Big Brother which he called "El Gran Carnal" or "Big Bro" in Mexican slang.

The show had returned after 10 years off the air on SKY and Canal 5, with a fourth season premiered on September 21, 2015.

Series details 
Big Brother

Big Brother VIP

Big Brother 1

Housemates

Nominations 

Notes:

  Carla and Rocío were automatically nominated by Big Brother for discussing nominations.
  Now, the audience had to vote for which housemate they would like to win the grand prize.

Big Brother VIP 1

Housemates

Nominations

Big Brother 2

Housemates

Nominations 

Notes:
 This Week there were no Nominations. Instead, Sabina won Head of Household and initially Nominated Alejandro and Óscar for Eviction, but Óscar's Nomination was Vetoed by Power of Veto winner Rodrigio, and Carolina was put up in his place.
 This Week Alfonso, Eduardo, Mauricio, Raquel, Rodrigio and Wendy were able to be nominated for 4 Points and 2 Points, instead of the usual 2 Points and 1 Point after winning a challenge.
 This Week the Housemate with the highest number of Nomination Points (Wendy) was Nominated and Eduardo, who was serving time in Gran Hermano Ecuador (Ecuador's version of Big Brother) Nominated one Housemate to join them - choosing Tatiana.
 Tatiana received the most Nominations and faced the Public Vote. After this Alfonso and Tatiana (challenge winners) had to choose the second Nominee, and chose Silvia.
 Mauricio received the most Nomination Points and was Nominated. This Week there were 2 groups; the first being Alfonso, Mauricio, Raquel and Silvia and the second Eduardo, Tony and Vanessa. The second group lost the competition and had to Nominate one member of their own group to join Mauricio, and they chose Eduardo.
 Silvia & Vanessa, the 2 nominated Housemates, had to nominate the third Housemate to be up for eviction, and they chose Alfonso.
 Alfonso won immunity so he couldn't nominate or be nominated.
 This Week the remaining four Housemates had to rank the other three Housemates in order of preference - their least favourite receiving three points, their next least favourite receiving two points and their favourite receiving just one point.
 All remaining Housemates face the vote to win.

Big Brother VIP 2

Housemates

Nominations 

Notes:
José Luis received the most nominations and had to choose the 2nd Nominee, and chose Travieso.
Gabriela & Roberto received the most votes and had to choose the 3rd nominee, they chose Travieso.
Omar received immunity from Aída who was part of an exchange from Gran Hermano Spain.
Adrián, Burro, Karla Omar & Yordi are initially nominated for eviction but the public voted to save one of the nominees. With 71.56% of the vote Omar was saved, to Yordi's 9.73%, Burro's 7.78%, Karla's 6.23% and Adrián 4.70%. Therefore, Adrián, Borru, Karla and Yordi (not saved by the Public) will all face the Public Vote this Week.
 Omar and Yolanda were initially Nominated. Vica and Yordi won a competition and they had to choose the 3rd nominee, choosing Roberto.
 This Week Housemates Nominated for 3, 2 and 1 Points instead of the usual 2 & 1.
 Nomination points were won in a task. Adrián won 8 points, Karla won 11 points, Omar won 10 points, Travieso won 12 points, Yolanda won 7 points and Yordi won 12 points. They distributed them as stated above.
 This Week Housemates competed for Points again, but this time four of them were in teams of two. Adrián and Travieso won 10 Points (and Nominated together), Omar and Yolanda also won 10, and Nominated together. Yordi Nominated alone, with the 5 Points they won.
 All Housemates remaining automatically face the vote to win.

Big Brother VIP 3 (Part 1)

Housemates

Nominations

Notes
:  Elizabeth and Fabián had won a task and they could save one of the nominees and nominate another one. They saved Elizabeth and nominated Carlos

:  Eduardo and Mercedes won 3 extra points in this round. They choose Fabián

:  Eduardo, Claudia, Mercedes, Manola, Juan José and Johnny won 1 extra point in this round

:  Mercedes, Manola and José Manuel choose José Manuel to be immune. Also in this round Mercedes, Manola, José Manuel, Claudia, Reynaldo and Eduardo choose Claudia to have a directly nomination

:  Gala started with -2 Claudia and -1 MercedesEduardo and José Manuel nominated directly to Fabián

Big Brother VIP 3 (Part 2)

Housemates

Nominations

Notes
: Patricio won a competition and got some privileges. He obtained immunity and chose Borrego to be immune too. Patricio had to choose a 3rd nominee. He chose Niurka.
: The Housemates had to nominate in pairs. The pairs were made by chance. Each pair had 8 points to split between a maximum of three Housemates. Carlos & Mariana won a dancing competition and they got some privileges. They obtained immunity. Carlos & Mariana had to choose a third nominee. They chose Sergio.
: The Housemates made two teams and played dominos. Each Housemate had to take a tile and give the points of the tile to the Housemates. Martha & Jorge took the double blank tile and did not nominate. Martha & Jorge had to choose a third nominee. They chose Patricio.
: Niurka is ejected from the house because she broke the isolation rule of Big Brother.
: The Housemates with less points (Fabiola, Mauricio, Patricio, Poncho & Roxanna) had to save one of the Housemates. They saved Mariana. The saved Housemate (Mariana) had to nominate another Housemate. She chose Héctor.
: The females were immune from nominating and being nominated. The females had to choose the third nominee. They chose Borrego.
: Paty entered the house as a replacement for Niurka.
: Each Housemate had five positive points (to save) to split between two nominations at least. They had to choose who they wanted to stay in the house. Mauricio (1), Patricio (1) & Sergio (1) received the fewest votes and are nominated. Roxanna received the most votes and had to choose a fourth nominee. She chose Paty.
: The Housemates made two teams and played a competition. The winners were Mariana, Carlos, Martha Julia, Paty, Sergio & Patricio and the losers were Héctor, Poncho, Fabiola, Roxanna & Jorge. The winners had to nominate one of the losers. They chose Poncho. The losers had to nominate one of them. They chose Jorge.
: Paty (10), Roxanna (10) & Sergio (9) were initially nominated. Then the winners of the weekly task had to guess who nominated them in order to subtract points from their count. Roxanna was the luckiest and she had 3 points subtracted (10-3=7). Paty (10), Sergio (9), Carlos (8) & Mariana (8) were the revised nominees. Next the Housemates had to throw some penalties like in football. As a consequence, Carlos was saved and Fabiola had to nominate another Housemate. She chose Héctor.
: The winners of the weekly task were Martha, Carlos, Sergio, Héctor & Roxanna. They could give immunity to one of them. They chose Héctor. The winners of the task had to nominate another Housemate. They chose Paty.
: Round 10 nominations were held before Round 9 evictions which is why the two evicted Housemates were able to nominate. Round 9's nominees (Patricio, Sergio, Martha Julia & Paty) were immune. Sergio & Paty (the survivors of Round 9) saved Roxanna and nominated Héctor.
: This time the women had to nominate the men and vice versa. The nominees had to choose a 4th nominee. They chose Sergio.
: Each nominee had to choose a sphere. Fabiola was the luckiest and she was saved.
:  At the final week, the public voted for the winner.

Big Brother 3R

Housemates

Nominations 

Notes:
On night one all housemates aside from Edgar, Francisco, and Jorge were asked to vote for which of the three they wanted to stay. Following the vote, Edgar was asked to vote to keep either Francisco or Jorge.
Housemates were asked to vote to keep either Edgar or Francisco in the house, whoever received the fewest votes between them would be evicted.
 On night one Anabella was asked to nominate someone for the first public eviction, she chose Stephany.
 In round three of nominations Edgar was given the power to automatically nominate someone for eviction, he chose Daniel.
 In round six of nominations housemates nominated housemates they wanted to stay.
 In round seven of nominations Edgar was nominated by Big Brother for losing a competition.
 In round eight of nominations housemates chose an egg, it had a number on it, this number represented the number of points they could award in nominations that week.
 In round nine of nominations some housemates received bonus/penalty points in a task that were added/deducted from their nomination total.
 In round ten of nominations the housemates had a variety of different nomination points that they could award.
 In round twelve of nominations Evelyn had to choose the first person up for eviction.
 In round thirteen of nominations housemates had ten points to award and nominated in pairs.
 In round fourteen of nominations Shotis received the most nominations and had the choice of saving herself and evicting Buki or stay nominated and Buki could stay in the house. She chose to save herself and evict Buki.
 In round fifteen of nominations housemates chose an egg, it had a number on it, this number represented the number of points they could award in nominations that week.

Big Brother VIP 4

Housemates

Nominations

Notes

Big Brother 4

References

External links
 
 

Mexico
Mexican reality television series
2002 Mexican television series debuts
Mexican television series based on Dutch television series